The Goffs Million is a flat horse race in Ireland open to two-year-old thoroughbreds. It is run at the Curragh and scheduled to take place each year in September. Originally, the Goffs Million was a race series run between 2006 and 2009. It was reintroduced in 2022 as a single race to promote the following week's sales.

History
The race is funded by Goffs, a leading Irish bloodstock auctioneer and was reserved for horses catalogued as yearlings in the previous year's Goffs Million Sale.

The first running was in 2006, when the Goffs Million was a single race contested over 7 furlongs (1,408 metres).

The event was split into two separate divisions in 2007. The divisions initially comprised the Goffs Fillies Million for fillies, and the Goffs (C & G) Million for colts and geldings.

A new format was introduced in 2009, when the divisions were the Goffs Million Sprint (over 6 furlongs), and the Goffs Million Mile (over 8 furlongs). The races were discontinued in 2010.

The race was reintroduced in 2022 and was restricted to horses in the catalogue at the 2021 Goffs Orby Sale.

Records
Leading jockey (2 wins):
 Richard Hughes – Soul City (2008), Lucky General (2009)

Leading trainer (3 wins):
 Richard Hannon Sr. – Minor Vamp (2008), Soul City (2008), Lucky General (2009)

Winners

See also
 Horse racing in Ireland
 List of Irish flat horse races

References

 Racing Post:

 pedigreequery.com – Goffs Million – Curragh.

Flat races in Ireland
Curragh Racecourse
Flat horse races for two-year-olds
Recurring sporting events established in 2006
Recurring sporting events disestablished in 2009
2006 establishments in Ireland
2009 disestablishments in Ireland
Recurring sporting events established in 2022
2022 establishments in Ireland